Hypopygus lepturus is a species of bluntnose knifefish and is commonly found in Northern South America. It is part of the family Hypopomidae and is occasionally kept as an aquarium fish. It lives in freshwater and grows up to 10 centimeters long.

References

Hypopomidae
Fish described in 1962